is a private junior college in the city of Hakodate, Hokkaidō, Japan.

It was established in 1953. It currently consists of two departments. The campus is across the street from Hakodate University.

References

External links
 Hakodate Junior College

Educational institutions established in 1953
Private universities and colleges in Japan
Japanese junior colleges
Universities and colleges in Hokkaido
1953 establishments in Japan